Rafael Velarde Echevarría was a government Minister of Peru under José Balta and Mariano Ignacio Prado.

References 

Government ministers of Peru
19th-century Peruvian people
Year of birth missing
Year of death missing